Mitrella nympha is a species of sea snail in the family Columbellidae, the dove snails.

Description
Members of the order Neogastropoda are mostly gonochoric and broadcast spawners. After birth, Mitrella nympha embryos develop into planktonic trocophore larvae, then into juvenile veligers before becoming fully grown adults.

Their shells vary between 9 mm and 13 mm in size and are in the shape of narrow tapered spirals.

Distribution
This marine species occurs in the Red Sea and off the Philippines.

References

 Vine, P. (1986). Red Sea Invertebrates. Immel Publishing, London. 224 pp.

External links
 Gastropods.com : Mitrella (Mitrella) nympha (with photos); accessed : 4 November 2010

nympha
Gastropods described in 1841